A rally in tennis is a collective name given to a sequence of back and forth shots between players, within a point. A rally starts with the  serve and the return of the serve, followed by continuous return shots until a point is scored which ends the rally.

See also

 Glossary of tennis terms
 Tennis shots
 Groundstroke

References

External links
 Guinness:Longest Tennis Rally - 51,283 strokes
 The Guardian:Longest Tennis Rally in a Tournament - 643 strokes
 Healthy Living:Difference between Rallying and Volleying in Tennis

Tennis terminology